The Hargrave River is a river in the Arctic Ocean drainage basin in Kitikmeot Region, Nunavut, Canada. It is on the Kent Peninsula, and has its mouth on Dease Strait.

See also
List of rivers of Nunavut

References

Rivers of Kitikmeot Region